Saprovore is variously defined, as:
 a detritus-eating animal
 any saprotroph or decomposer, i.e. any organism feeding on dead organic matter (see Saprotrophic nutrition)